Paradise is a 1998 novel by Toni Morrison, and her first since winning the Nobel Prize in Literature in 1993.  According to the author, Paradise completes a "trilogy" that begins with Beloved (1987) and includes Jazz (1992).

Paradise was chosen as an Oprah's Book Club selection for January 1998 and ranked in the BlackBoard Bestsellers List the following August. Morrison wanted to call the novel War but was overridden by her editor.

Plot
The novel is structured into nine sections. The first is named "Ruby" after the town on which the book centers. The rest are named for women implicated variously in the life of the town and the Convent. The Convent women are Mavis, Grace (known as "Gigi"), Seneca, Divine (whose name is actually "Pallas"), and Consolata (also known as "Connie"). The Ruby women – or children, in the case of Save-Marie – are Patricia and Lone. Though the chapters are named for specific characters, in telling their stories, Morrison tells the parallel histories of the town of Ruby and the Convent 17 miles south of it, and how the men of Ruby become intent on destroying the Convent women.

Ruby

Paradise opens in 1976 with nine men going in for the kill. They are the prominent men of Ruby, a purposefully isolated, peaceful all-black town in Oklahoma with a population of 360. In this group are the twins Steward and Deacon "Deek" Morgan, the de facto leaders of the town. Throughout the book we gradually learn why Ruby was founded, the history of the failed town of Haven that preceded it, and the reasons for Ruby's rigid hierarchies and stringent exclusion of outsiders, to the point where the town's leaders decide they must eliminate the nearby Convent which in fact is not a convent but rather a former embezzler's mansion now inhabited by a group of women with troubled pasts.

Before Ruby, there was Haven. Founded in Oklahoma in 1890, Haven was founded by a group containing nine complete families (the Blackhorses, Beauchamps, Catos, two DuPres families, Fleetwoods, Floods, Morgans, and Pooles) and fragments of others. The founding fathers, led by Zechariah Morgan, are motivated to found a new community by the exclusion they face from public life and job opportunities, both as black men and particularly as dark-skinned black men. When they arrive in the place where they decide to situate their new town, they first built a large and sturdy Oven of brick and iron, even though they are living in wagons and sod shelters. The Oven both nourishes them and serves as a symbol of everything they have achieved.

Haven flourishes for several decades but falters in the post World War II period. Returning from service, the twins Deacon and Steward Morgan perceive that not much has changed in the outside world since Haven was founded: there is still rampant colorism and anti-black discrimination. Preferring to renew the mission begun by their forefathers of self-sufficient isolation from the outside world, in 1949 they lead a group of 15 families out of Haven to establish a new all-black town. The men take the Oven with them when they leave Haven at the expense of other supplies, and painstakingly rebuild it when they arrive, although in the new town it serves principally a symbolic rather than practical purpose. Though called "New Haven" in the interim, it is eventually named "Ruby", after the younger sister of the Morgan twins who dies when she is repeatedly refused medical attention because of her race. The name of the town, therefore, belies the way in which it is founded out of the indignation of exclusion, and the inability of black men to “protect” black women in the outside world. The inhabitants are proud of the fact that Ruby has no jail or cemetery because it has never needed either; besides Ruby Smith herself and Delia Best, no one has ever died on its soil.

Though there are 15 founding families of Ruby, we learn that there are hierarchies. Of the 15 there were nine considered racially pure, a number that has dwindled to seven. The Morgan twins are able to assume unchallenged power in the town because their father founded the bank, and they, therefore, have amassed the most money and property. Ruby becomes the inverse of the outside world: though whites are hated in an abstract way, light-skinned blacks are specifically discriminated against–if not, ideally, kept out altogether. Though for some of its residents Ruby is a reprieve from the race-based discrimination of the world “Out There,” it still has a strongly patriarchal structure. The town's strict racial codes have harmed some of its residents severely. Menus’ alcoholism, though publicly attributed to his experiences during the Vietnam War, seems to stem from the shame and despair he has felt ever since he abandoned the light-skinned woman he intended to marry. Likewise, the men of Ruby refuse to seek outside medical help in an emergency for Delia Best, Roger Best's light-skinned wife, causing her to die in childbirth in a tragic mirror of Ruby Smith's experience.

At the point at which the book opens, there is great anxiety about Ruby's future. The town has seen increasingly open signs of division. Steward and Dovey Morgan have not been able to have children and Deek and Soane's sons die at war, leaving no Morgan heir to Ruby's leadership besides K.D. Smith, an often insolent young man who angers his uncles by spending time chasing after Gigi, one of the Convent women. The Reverend Richard Misner, a young upstart recently arrived in town, is deeply invested in the civil rights struggle, models himself after Martin Luther King, and believes Ruby needs to be more open to the changes afoot in the outside world; in turn, the older generations believe he is engendering radicalism and rebelliousness among the town's youth. The Oven has been taken over as a hangout spot for local youth, and one day it is graffitied with a Black Power fist with red-painted nails. The elder generations believe that the young do not understand or respect Ruby's history, encapsulated in their desire to modify the slogan that appears on the Oven: though it now says only "… the Furrow of his Brow", the town elders claim it used to say "Beware" at the beginning, whereas the younger generation wishes to make it "Be the Furrow of his Brow". Finally, the town is scandalized when the Convent women make a rowdy appearance at K.D. and Arnette's wedding, a wedding partly intended to ease the conflict between the Morgan and Fleetwood families and to conceal Arnette's earlier aborted pregnancy by K.D.

Eventually, after a series of selectively interpreted "signs", and based on the perception that the Convent is corrupting the town with its amorality and purported witchcraft, Sergeant Person, Wisdom Poole, Arnold and Jeff Fleetwood, Harper and Menus Jury, Steward and Deacon Morgan, and K.D. Smith decide during a meeting at the Oven to destroy the Convent.

The Convent

The Convent is an elaborate mansion built by an embezzler in an isolated part of Oklahoma. Its architecture reflects both its creator's hedonism and his paranoia: shaped like the cartridge of a gun, it is windowless in one end. The paranoia is justified because the embezzler lives only briefly in the mansion before he is arrested by Northern lawmen. The mansion then falls into the hands of some Catholic nuns, the presence of which is an anomaly in the principally Protestant Oklahoma. The property becomes widely known as ‘the Convent’ although it serves principally as a boarding school for Indian girls where they are educated to forget their culture. The Mother Superior Mary Magna is the administrator of the school and is faithfully served by Consolata, a woman she kidnapped when the latter was an orphan living in destitution.

During this period, the families from Haven have settled into the area 17 miles south of the Convent. There is not much interaction between the Convent and the town, though Mary Magna is glad to have a pharmacy close by. On one trip into Ruby, Consolata spots Deacon "Deek" Steward, with whom she has a two-month affair that ends when she repulses him with the carnal intensity of her desire.

When the foundation that funds the school begins to run out of money, the nuns are gradually reassigned or moved on to other posts, and the last two Indian girls run away. However, Mary Magna, Sister Roberta, and Consolata remain behind. In order to maintain the Convent and avoid incurring debt, the women begin a burgeoning business from things they produce on their property; in addition to their renowned extra-hot peppers, they also sell relishes, barbecue sauce, pies, and eggs. Eventually, Sister Roberta moves into a nursing home and Consolata dedicates herself to the care of Mary Magna, who falls into a long illness.

It is around this time that women begin to arrive at the Convent. They arrive by accident, in flight from fraught lives (abusive husbands and dead babies; parental betrayal or neglect; abandonment by lovers and violent pasts), but one by one they seem drawn into staying permanently. The first is Mavis; Gigi, Seneca, and Pallas then follow. They do not all get along – Mavis and Gigi in particular often clash. However, they seem to find in the Convent an escape from troubled circumstances (often related to men) where they are listened to and cared for without judgment. Though they may leave from time to time, the women always return.

In the same way, during this stage of the Convent's history, women of Ruby – as well as one man, Menus – come to the Convent in times of need. The problems and compulsions that the elder statesmen of Ruby would prefer to sweep under the rug seem inevitably to end up at the Convent. Soane, Deek's wife, comes to confront Connie about her affair and ends up becoming her friend, from whom she later receives "tonics" that help ease her mind in the aftermath of her sons’ deaths at war. Arnette becomes pregnant by K.D. and stays at the Convent to carry the pregnancy to term, though she tries and succeeds in inducing an abortion by self-harm (Ruby residents speculate that the Convent women beat her and caused her to lose the baby, a lie that Arnette encourages). Billie Delia stays at the Convent after a violent fight with her mother, who believes, like the rest of the town, that she is wild and promiscuous. K.D. carries on a two-year affair with Gigi, who leaves him, solidifying his hatred of the Convent. The women of the Convent care for Menus as he recovers from alcoholism.

Throughout the novel, the women of the Convent provide a safe haven for all those who come to its doorstep. However, the Convent is widely perceived as a corrupting influence in Ruby, the source of their problems rather than where problems must go because of Ruby's intolerant atmosphere. Instead of considering the roots of the conflicts in Ruby (such as the unspoken prejudice against light-skinned blacks, borne of the rejection the original families experienced on their journey to found Haven; or the yearning of the young people to be part of the larger world and participate in the civil rights movement), community leaders decide that the Convent must be destroyed. Under their rhetoric, the men of Ruby are both frightened and disgusted by the idea of women who do not need – and, in fact, actually, shun – men. They also have various selfish motivations behind their moral crusade: Sargeant Person, for example, would no longer have to pay to lease farmland from the Convent.

The men solidify their plot against the women one evening at the Convent. Lone DuPres overhears the men and rushes to find someone to help her stop them because she cares about the Convent women but also because their behavior may unwittingly destroy Ruby. A group of nine men – a number mirroring the original, racially pure families that founded Ruby – venture to the Convent under cover of darkness with guns, shooting the women on sight. Some of the women fight back, injuring Arnold, Jeff Fleetwood, Harper Jury, and Menus, but eventually, the men shoot them down in the field as they escape. In the middle of this chaos, Lone and the willing townspeople she has assembled arrive at the Convent. Under censure none of the men claims responsibility or intent to kill; everyone fears the white law they presume will be involved now that they have killed a white woman. However, Deek Steward speaks up to acknowledge culpability, signaling a break with his twin brother Steward, with whom he has agreed on everything for decades.

However, when Roger Best arrives to bury the bodies, he finds nothing. Mavis’ Cadillac is also gone. From this, many in Ruby conclude that the women somehow survived and drove away. Lone, however, believes that it is a sign from God, who has taken the bodies of his servants to Heaven whole, in the manner of Mary at the Assumption. The town carries on, relieved that the absence of bodies spares them the attention of white law enforcement. Each man involved tells a different story of what happened. If not for Luther Beauchamp, Pious DuPres, and Deed and Aaron Sands, who corroborate Lone's version, the town might even have proceeded as though it never happened. However, Lone observes that though the bodies themselves might have disappeared, the ramifications of the attack are evident in the town. Menus succumbs to his renewed alcoholism. Deek is unusually troubled and goes to the Reverend Richard Misner for spiritual assistance. K.D. and Arnette continue to build their family and look forward to assuming a position in town where they can make life difficult for K.D.'s critics. Most of all, there is a sensation that the deal brokered by Ruby's founders with God is broken and that death has finally arrived in town: the last chapter takes place at the funeral of Save-Marie, one of Jeff and Sweetie Fleetwood's disabled children. The town remains divided, but Richard Misner decides to stay, in part because he feels he can be useful in this flawed town where change and forces of the outside world must inevitably arrive.

Paradise closes with a passage about each of the Convent women. Gigi, Pallas, Mavis, and Seneca appear suddenly and surprisingly to figures from their past, each of whom expresses regret and sadness. Gigi's father, whom we discover for the first time and learn has been in prison since Gigi was eleven, spots her by a lake and encourages her to stay in touch with him. Pallas’ mother, Dee Dee, believes she spots Pallas with a baby near her house, but is unable to speak coherently to flag her attention. Sally Albright, whom we know as Sal from the “Mavis” chapter, spots her mother in a diner, and the two women apologize to each other. Jean, the woman Seneca believed was her sister, is revealed to be her mother. Jean believes she spots Seneca in a stadium parking lot, but Seneca does not remember her. Connie rests her head in the lap of an older woman from her past, Piedade, who sings to her as they face the ocean in a place called "Paradise".
Morrison has said in an interview on PBS that she started with race ("They shoot the white girl. . . ") and then erased it by never revealing who the white girl is.

Ruby chapter
The book begins with the well-known sentence "They shoot the white girl first." Never revealing who that character is, it leaves the reader to wonder. A group of nine men enter the building known as the "Convent", which is now more of a shelter for battered women. As the men search the Convent they clearly indicate their feelings towards it. Because the men are in this house, the story is written to make it seem like the Convent was a sinister place, a shameful place in the men's eyes, one negative statement being "in a place that once housed Christians – well, Catholics anyway – not a cross of Jesus anywhere" (7). During this search we find out several things about the men searching. Two of the men are wearing ties, while another set are a father and son, and finally a pair of brothers are among the posse. Ruby is also the town named after Ruby Morgan who died after their journey to this new place of hope, after being denied aid at other black towns and hospitals. They left Haven escaping the economic downturn and the increasing pressure from neighboring towns. Several families founded Ruby but the majority of the credit belongs to the Morgans due to their monetary influence. On their journey, they saw many other black towns that refused them acceptance, illustrating the exclusivity defining one's own paradise and the fear of letting the outside in. This may have led to the hatred of the women living in the Convent, without any real reason except the fact they are outside the calm setting of Ruby.

Mavis chapter
Mavis is a mother who kills her infant twins Merle and Pearl by suffocation when she leaves them in the car while she goes into a grocery store. It is unclear whether it was an accident or she has some sort of mental illness. Her husband Frank is an alcoholic and abusive, which contributes to blowing her fears and anxieties out of proportion. She fears that her husband and three kids, Sal, Frankie, and Billy James, are going to kill her. She waits for her husband to go to sleep then she sneaks out of her house and steals his car, a mint green Cadillac, escaping her family. At 5:30 am she arrives at Peg's house (neighbor) but when no one answers she realizes it's a bad idea and decides to go somewhere farther away. She gets gas for the car and drives to her mom's house in Paterson, five hours away. Her mother says that Frank already called her at 5:30 and she told him she did not know Mavis' whereabouts. Mavis tells her mom that she feared her family was going to kill her.  Her mother thinks Mavis is crazy for thinking this. 
She stays there for a few days. Later, she hears her mom on the phone saying, "you better get up here pronto". This freaks her out and she takes the car keys her mom hid plus a few essential items and hits the road. She went to Newark and had the Cadillac painted magenta in order to avoid detection. Mavis decides she wants to go to California. She has little money so she picks up female hitchhikers to have them help pay the way and keep her company. The first woman was Sandra. She wore 6 dog tags and talked a lot. The next women stole her clip she got at her mothers, and the next two women wanted to go to a cemetery to honor an army man. The last woman was Bennie. She liked to sing songs and listen to the radio. She stole Mavis's rain boots and coat. She disappeared while Mavis was in the bathroom at a pit stop. 
When Mavis returned the bathroom key, she sees a man who she believes is Frank looking at her car. He has let his hair grow out and is wearing a leather jacket and chains with a shirt open to the navel. She looks again and he's gone. She is worried that he recognized the car because the license plate is still the same. She goes out to her car and pays the attendant. The man appears in her rightside mirror. Mavis freaks out and drives away without thinking of what road she needed to get on. She becomes lost and then runs out of gas. She drinks alcohol that Frank had left in the car and goes to sleep. The next morning she gets out of the car and decides to walk and find a place to help her. She walks a long way and finds a house on a farm lot. She meets a woman outside named Connie. Connie is nice to her and feeds her. Soane Morgan comes to the house and gives Connie new sunglasses. Connie asks Soane to help her get gasoline for Mavis. Sloane takes Mavis to a gas station where a young black man takes Mavis back to her car with the gasoline. The man talks to Mavis and says how he thinks Connie is strange. She returns with her car to the house. She learns that it was a nun's house and a school for Indians. She also gets to meet Mother Mary Magna who had a light coming from her.  She was the leader figure of the convent house. Mavis stayed at the convent instead of going to California; however, she left the convent off and on but she was there in 1976. She knew for months that there was sourness between the town and the convent ...

Grace chapter
Gigi (Grace) gets off the bus in Ruby as K.D. and Arnette are arguing. Arnette was pregnant with K.D.'s child and Arnette was not giving him many options. K.D. slaps Arnette due to her comments about the boys seeing Gigi walk off the bus, which turns into a town council meeting involving her father and K.D.'s uncles as well as other prominent men. We find out that Gigi gets to Ruby after being deceived by her old boyfriend Mikey. She intends to only be in Ruby a short while. She gets picked up by a man who is willing to take her to the train station. She finds that he is a hearse driver who is stopping by the Convent to pick up Mother who had recently died. We find out that the bus driver's name is Roger Best. Gigi goes inside and finds some food in the kitchen, which she begins to eat. Connie comes into the kitchen and explains how she has not slept for 17 days straight because of fear no one was there to watch her. She just wants to sleep on the kitchen floor and will do so, if Gigi watches her. Gigi feels bad about leaving her and in turn loses her ride and she stays with Connie and eats the funeral food until Connie wakes up. K.D. cannot stop thinking about Gigi so he goes to find her and ends up at the Convent. He takes her for a ride. One month passes and Mavis comes back to the convent, which she has missed so dearly. As she is walking up, she sees a girl, who is in fact Gigi, sitting naked and begins screaming at her. Connie comes out and explains to Mavis that mother has died and Gigi came the day after mother died. Mavis then explains how Gigi (Grace) will never be one of them.

Symbols
Within Paradise, color is used as a symbol. For example, the color green frequently shows up within the novel. On one occasion, as Mavis is heading down the highway to escape her life, "a green cross in the field of white slid from brilliant emergency light into shadow" (28). The cross symbolizes the covenant and the color green conjures up ideas of freedom, rebirth, growth, and harmony.
The other references to the color green occur when the men are in the bathroom at Convent in the Ruby chapter: "The tile underfoot is bottle green" (9); when Mavis drove two hitchhikers to the cemetery, "Mavis lingered, amazed by the unnatural brightness of the green" (34); when Mother speaks of Connie, "When I brought her here they were green as grass" (47); and mentioned in the part before KD sees Gigi for the first time: "Behind a chain-link fence bordered by wide seamless concrete he saw green water" (57).

The Oven

Haven was the town founded by the fathers and grandfathers of the men of Ruby. When Haven was founded, one of the first things they built was an oven. Both in Haven and Ruby, the Oven is the center of their communities. An oven signifies a kitchen and the outdated notion of being the women's domestic sphere. However, in Paradise, the oven symbolizes the history of African American women's domestic labor during enslavement until the Jim Crow era. The men of Haven construct the Oven so that their women would not have to work in the homes of white families where their wives and daughters were subject to sexual abuse and mistreatment. Both the men of Haven and Ruby exhibit a desire to protect the virtue of their women that can be patriarchal in nature. This is seen through their intense hatred for the Convent women who are unconventional and nonconforming.

Characters

Convent residents
Consolata (Connie): Brought to the Convent as child by Reverend Mother Mary Magna. Begins drinking heavily after Mary Magna's death. Considered the leader/mother figure of the Convent women.
Mavis: Housewife who leaves her family after accidentally killing her young twins Merle and Pearl. Arrives at the Convent after running out of gas while on the way to California. Stays, leaves and returns to the Convent often. Seems paranoid, once saying that her own children have been poisoned in the head by their father and are plotting to kill her, seeing figures of her husband that may not actually be there. Constantly fights with Gigi.
Grace (Gigi): Attractive, strongly opinionated, free-spirited woman who left her imprisoned boyfriend Mikey Rood. Has a two-year fling with K.D. that ends badly.
Seneca: Abandoned as a child and living in several foster homes. Encouraged to leave her imprisoned boyfriend Eddie Turtle by his mother. Becomes Gigi's roommate. Secretly cuts herself. Has low self-esteem, always trying to please others. Abused by Eddie who makes her feel worthless by always yelling at her and telling her she cannot do anything right. 
Pallas (Divine) Truelove: 16-year-old girl from a rich family. Ran away with and was betrayed by her lover Carlos. Brought to the Convent by Billie Delia. Nicknamed Divine by Gigi, after her mother.

Ruby townspeople

The Morgan Family
Deacon "Deek" Morgan: Steward's twin, brother of Ruby Morgan. Grandson of one of the founders of Haven. Hold a great deal of influence in town. Own/run the town bank.  Married to Soane, lost both of their sons in the Vietnam War. Previously had an affair with Connie. Known to be the subtler of the Morgan twins.  Both Morgan twins are stuck in the old ways and are concerned with upholding tradition.  They use their ownership of the bank to control the town and take power away from others.
Steward Morgan: Deacon's twin, brother of Ruby Morgan. Grandson of one of the founders of Haven. Hold a great deal of influence in town. Own/run the town bank. Married to Dovey, they are unable to have children as both are infertile. Known for his inflammatory speech. Both Morgan twins are stuck in the old ways and are concerned with upholding tradition.  They use their ownership of the bank to control the town and take power away from others.
Dovey Morgan: Steward's wife. Miscarried several times and cannot have children. Is having an affair with a stranger.
Soane Morgan: Deacon's wife. Lost two sons in war. She went to the Convent to abort her third child. When Connie would not help her, Soane lost the baby. She had never intended to abort the baby, but wanted to let Connie know that she knew about Connie's affair with Deek. She believes that she lost her baby because of her ruse. Later becomes friends with Connie.
K.D. (Kentucky Derby) Morgan: Son of Ruby Morgan. Known for chasing women and has a child with Arnette Fleetwood. Although never taking his fatherly responsibility, he is  protected by his family's reputation. He is considered the heir of the town and is under the protection of his uncles, Deacon and Steward.
Ruby Morgan: was the first person to die within the town and the town was named after her.

The Cato/Best family
Roger Best: First to marry outside of Ruby townspeople. His wife looked white and their children are light-skinned, which gave the family a negative reputation in town.
Patricia Best: Daughter of Roger Best, widow of Billy Cato. Teacher researching town history.
Billie Delia Cato: Daughter of Patricia Best and Billy Cato. Thought to be the town's "fast" girl. In love with brothers Apollo and Brood Poole, moved out of town after fight with mother.

The Fleetwood family
Arnold "Fleet" Fleetwood: Father of Jefferson and Arnette Fleetwood.  Married to Mable Fleetwood. Sleeps on a hideaway in the dining room.  Owes the bank money.
Mable Fleetwood:Married to Arnold Fleetwood.  Spends all her time working with Sweetie to care for Sweetie and Jeff's four surviving children.
Jefferson Fleetwood: Son of Arnold and Mable Fleetwood. Threatened to shoot K.D. for mistreating Arnette. Controlling. Fought in the Vietnam War.  Married Sweetie 
Sweetie Fleetwood: Jefferson's wife. Gave birth to children who are mentally and physically damaged, and spends all of her time caring for them.
Arnette Fleetwood: Jefferson's younger sister. Planning to attend Langston for college. Made advances on K.D. at socials and whenever possible, eventually became pregnant by K.D. around 15 years old. Attempted to abort, but gave birth at Convent and abandoned baby.

The Albright family
Frank Albright: Mavis's husband, who seems to be abusive 
Sally Albright: Also goes by Sal, Mavis believes that Sal wants to kill her because Sal believes that Mavis killed the twins on purpose
Frank and Billy Albright: Mavis and Frank's sons 
Merle and Pearl: The deceased twins that suffocated in the car when Mavis ran inside the grocery store.

Others
Anna Flood: Daughter of Ace Flood. Inherited her father's store. Involved with Richard Misner. Left Ruby for Detroit and came back when her father died.
Richard Misner: Younger reverend, involved with Anna Flood.
Senior Pulliam: Older reverend, constantly at odds with Misner. 
Lone DuPres: Adopted daughter of Fairy DuPres. Midwife who became unpopular after supposedly causing the defects in Sweetie's children. Taught black magic to Connie.
Norma Keene Fox: A wealthy women who hires Seneca for sexual humiliation while her husband is away. She pays her 500 dollars and gives her a nice place to stay and feeds her well for three weeks.
David: Norma Keene Fox's limo driver. He also hunts out the girls for Mrs Fox.
Eddie Turtle: Seneca's ex-boyfriend, who is now in jail.

References 

1997 American novels
Novels by Toni Morrison
Alfred A. Knopf books
Novels set in Oklahoma
African-American novels